Rasha Kelej is an Egyptian Senator . Among the 100 appointments made by President Abdel Fattah el-Sisi to the Senate in 2020, she will serve a five-year term. Kelej has been working for women's empowerment and improved access to  healthcare in African and other developing countries.

Biography 
Kelej was born in 1972 in Alexandria and pursued a degree in pharmacy at Alexandria University. She started working in the pharmaceutical industry in 1994 and joined Merck KGaA in 1996. She was appointed as the CEO of Merck Foundation in 2016.

Kelej has been behind campaigns like "More than a Mother " Campaign which helps in breaking the stigma around infertility and empowering infertile and childless women in Africa. and trained fertility specialists in countries like Gambia, Sierra Leone, Guinea, Liberia, Chad and Niger and the Central African Republic. Kelej's campaign partnered with several first ladies of African countries.

Rasha has also enabled to train many  healthcare providers in many critical and underserved specialties such as oncology, diabetes, cardiovascular, respiratory, intensive care, endocrinology and sexual and reproductive heath through Merck Foundation programs.

In 2019, Kelej was included in New African Magazine's list of the 100 Most Influential Africans.

References 

Egyptian social workers
1972 births
Living people